Central Christian Church is a major church in downtown Austin, Texas affiliated with the Christian Church (Disciples of Christ). Organized in 1847, it is one of the oldest congregations in the city.

The church has also been known as Christian Church of Austin. The current church building, featuring Romanesque Revival architecture, was completed in 1929. The building was added to the National Register of Historic Places in 1992.

Texas Historical Commission Marker Text
In 1847, eight years after the City of Austin was platted, ten members of the Disciples of Christ Brotherhood met to organize this congregation. Although early records of the church are scarce, it is known that regular worship services were being held in a local school building by 1852. The Christian Church of Austin, as the congregation originally was known, acquired its first property at Eighth and Colorado Streets and worshiped at that site until moving to this location in 1929. An early dispute over theological and procedural matters split the congregation in 1888. Until 1896, when the Rev. S. D. Dutcher was appointed pastor, leaders of the church were selected from among the laity. The fellowship adopted its current name during the early years of the twentieth century, after other Disciples of Christ congregations had been organized in Austin. Although much growth has occurred in the outlying sections of the city, Central Christian Church has remained a vital force in the downtown area. Its ministry has included the establishment of several other congregations. As one of the oldest churches in Austin, Central Christian has provided the city with significant service and leadership. (1985)

References

External links
 Central Christian Church

Churches on the National Register of Historic Places in Texas
Churches completed in 1929
Churches in Austin, Texas
Christian Church (Disciples of Christ) congregations
National Register of Historic Places in Austin, Texas